Ban Laeng is a village and tambon (subdistrict) of Mueang Lampang District, in Lampang Province, Thailand. In 2005 it had a population of 6993 people. The tambon contains 12 villages.

References

Tambon of Lampang province
Populated places in Lampang province